Brickell Avenue is a north–south road that was formerly part of U.S. Route 1, in Miami, Florida, just south of the Miami River. North of the Brickell Avenue Bridge, U.S. Route 1 is known as Biscayne Boulevard. Brickell Avenue is the main road through the Brickell financial district of Downtown Miami and is considered the Park Avenue of Florida. Brickell Avenue is lined with high-rise office buildings and residential condominiums, as well as many banks and restaurants. It is also famed for "Millionaire Row's" home to a cluster of Miami's most expensive residences. 

It is a grid plan main north–south thoroughfare through the south part of Miami's central business district.

Route description
Brickell Avenue from the Miami River south it continues south-southwest and upon crossing Broadway/SE 15th Street it curves southwest and continues in that direction until it terminates at Southeast 26th Road/Rickenbacker Causeway, becoming South Federal Highway for a short distance (about 1/4 mile) until it becomes South Dixie Highway - US1. The portion north of the one-way pair of 7th and 8th Streets carries U.S. Route 41.

Notable attractions on Brickell Avenue
Brickell's cultural significance has arguably surpassed downtown because its bar and restaurant zone brings in large crowds well into late night - early morning hours. Popular restaurants on Brickell Avenue include Komodo, La Petit Maison, Truluck's, and Cipriani. 

Many of the restaurants on Brickell Ave transform from bright, open restaurants during the day to inviting and sensual by night. Some of the places include Barsecco, Baby Jane Cocktail & Noodle Bar, and The Bar at Level 25.

There are also a few historic places on Brickell Ave such as Brickell Mausoleum and Villa Serena, a home built on the former "Millioniare's Mile" for William Jennings Bryan, a former politician in 1913.

Major intersections

Gallery

References

Roads in Miami
U.S. Route 1